Shirasagi (Japanese for egret, 白鷺) may refer to:

 Shirasagi (train), a limited express train in Japan
 Shirasagi Station, a railway station in Sakai, Japan
 Shirasagi, a 1958 Japanese film known also as The Snowy Heron
 Shirasagi-jō, another name of Himeji Castle
 Shirasagi: 13 Japanese Birds Pt. 11, an album by Masami Akita